The Former Police Station, Barton-upon-Humber is a Grade II Listed building in Barton-upon-Humber, North Lincolnshire, England.

History
The building was designed by the architect James Sandby Padley and constructed in 1847.  It operated as a Police station and a Magistrate's court; the court closed in 1995 and the police station relocated to a different site in 2005. A blue plaque recording these events was erected on the building in 2007.

Architecture

The original building was single-storied. The court room for the Magistrate was on the right and the accommodation for the constable on the left. It had two cells and ancillary rooms in its middle range. The bricks are locally sourced and the roof is Welsh slate.

References

1847 establishments in England
Buildings and structures in Lincolnshire
Grade II listed buildings in North Lincolnshire
Barton-upon-Humber
Police stations in England